The Sub-Parish Church of Santo Cristo, also known as "Apo Kristo" Chapel and Visita ng Sto. Cristo, is the oldest "ermita" (chapel) in Baliuag, Bulacan, Philippines. The visita is bounded by the cities of San Fernando and Mabalacat in Pampanga, and Balanga in Bataan. At present, its mother Parish, the Saint Augustine Parish Church of Baliuag, Bulacan (under its first parish priest Padre Juan de Albarrran), has 4 parishes.

The "Visita ng Sto. Cristo" (Dioecesis Malolosina, Suffragan of Manila) celebrated its 131st anniversary on May 3, 2012, with a pontifical Mass co-celebrated with its mother parish of St. Augustine's Church. The Mass in this Visita is being celebrated by the Team Ministry of Saint Augustine Parish headed by Rev. Fr. Narciso Sampana, together with Rev. Fr.  Virgilio Cruz and Rev. Fr. Lou Salvador Jess de Silva.

The St. Augustine Church of Baliuag and the Sub-Parish Church of Santo Cristo both belong to the Roman Catholic Diocese of Malolos (which was created on November 25, 1961, and erected on March 11, 1962, and comprises the civil province of Bulacan and the City of Valenzuela, under the Patronage of the Immaculate Conception, Feast day of December 8). The Bisita ng Santo Kristo is under Saint Augustine Parish Church jurisdiction.

History

During the Spanish colonization period of the 1880s, the settlement, baryo of Baliuag, had no name until it was called "Santo Cristo." The Feast Day was celebrated annually on May 3, led by a "President" of the Fiesta. Brother Juan was the first, while Kabisera Andres Ramos was the caretaker of the Statue or Holy Image, according to writer Alejandro Fernando. They chose the "Hubad" (naked) Kristo as their Patron due to poverty. Ever since, immigrants and pilgrims from many provinces have visited the miraculous statue of the Chapel on Fridays and Sundays. More than 12 local and visitor's faith healers conducted regular Friday spiritual healing there. Nipa leaves and bamboo were used to build the small Kapilya.

During the American regime, Jeremiah James Harty [(November 5, 1853—October 29, 1927, an American prelate of the Catholic Church, the Archbishop of Manila in the Philippines from 1903 to 1916) who later served as Archbishop of Omaha from 1916 to 1927)] filed a suit in the Court of First Instance of Bulacan, claiming title of the Santo Cristo, Baliuag, Bulacan Parish Church property on 1909. The prelate included in the civil case, the properties where the San Jose and Makinabang Parish Churches were built upon.

The defendants filed an answer by way of opposition thereto. The residents alleging, inter alia, that the subject real estate is owned by them by virtue of a Deed of Donation signed by Don Julian Buyson. This Spanish Mestizo was a philanthropist who bestowed upon the natives of the Santo Cristo neighborhood the lot where an "ermita" or Bisita was built for religious and liturgical needs of the townsfolk, per a notarial Document dated August 1, 1881. The condition specified in the public document that the chapel and school built upon the lot must be used by and for the neighborhood residents for devotional purposes.

Further, the Deed required the administration of the property by a) Hermano Mayor (Elder), b) Mayor domo (Steward) and c) Secretaryo (Secretary). Willie Buyson Villarama, Gloria Macapagal Arroyo's former chief of staff, from Bacolor, Pampanga stated that "his great-great-great grandfather is Don Julian Buyson, who served as a gobernadorcillo, xxx".

The CFI of Malolos Auxiliary Judge Buenaventura Reyes dismissed the Archbishop's complaint for recovery of possession and title. Later, in 1930, the Bulacan Court ordered the Registry of Property to issue Original Certificates of Titles to the 3 donated properties in the names of the 3 emitas or kapilyas: Ermita de Santo Cristo, Ermita de San Jose Parish Churches of Santo Cristo, Makinabang and Concepcion, Baliuag, Bulacan.

Later, the people acquired the adjacent lot where they built the grandstand and 4 comfort rooms. On its 100th anniversary on May 3, 1981, the Santo Cristo Parish Church was inaugurated under the leadership of Mauricio Pascual.

Since 1988, Santo Cristo Church is presently under the care and administration of the Sub-Parish Pastoral Council of Barangay Santo Cristo, Baliuag, Bulacan.

Past presidents of Pastoral Council Sub-Parish of Sto. Cristo were: Donato A. Pascual 1988–1990; Engr. Precioso Donato F. Punzalan 1990–1992; Arsenio Mangalile 1992–1994; Herminio S. Toribio 1994–1998; Boy Pascual and Belen Marcelo. The present President is Amelia Santos.

Image gallery

References

Books 
Baliwag: Then and Now, by Roland E. Villacorte, Philippine Graphic Arts, Inc., Caloocan, 1970, 1985 * 2001 editions. pp. 436–439 & 351-3 (1985 edition).

Sources
The 2010–2011 Catholic Directory of the Philippines (published by Claretian Publications for the Catholic Bishops' Conference of the Philippines, June 2010)
 http://www.newadvent.org/cathen/15633c.htm

External links 

 Coordinates of Sto. Cristo Church
 Don J. Buyson
 Diocese of Malolos
 Santo Cristo Church

Roman Catholic churches in Bulacan
1881 establishments in the Philippines
Religious organizations established in 1881
Roman Catholic churches completed in 1881
19th-century Roman Catholic church buildings in the Philippines